Una Lorraine Morris (born 17 January 1947) is a retired Jamaican sprinter, physician, restaurateur, and food caterer. She represented Jamaica at the 1964, 1968 and 1972 Olympics in eight sprint events in total, with the best achievement of fourth place in the 200 metres in 1964. She won a bronze medal in the 4×100 metres relay at the 1967 Pan American Games. in 1963 and 1964 she was chosen as Jamaican Sportswoman of the Year.

Currently, she is a radiologist, and was the owner of the Kingston Cafe restaurant in Pasadena, California, which was featured on an episode of the American television reality show Kitchen Nightmares with Gordon Ramsay in 2011. In August 2018, the restaurant closed and was converted into a catering business.

She is currently working toward completion of a law degree at Abraham Lincoln Law School.

Career highlights 

 Youngest Jamaican to be in the top four in the Olympics.
 Held the Jamaican national record in the 200 meters, 400 meters, 800 meters and pentathlon.
 Held the world indoor 300 meters broke it 1967 in Vancouver British Columbia.
 Won the first NCAA women's 200 meters in Illinois Chicago.
 Won AAU indoors 200 meters.
 Silver medalist AAU 400 meters 1964
 Won; gold medalist in CAC games 200 meters and 4X100 meter relay.
 Silver Medalist in 200 meters World vs the Americas.
Bronze medalist in the women's 440 yards Commonwealth games 1966.
School Girl Champion in girls championship 1964 and 1965. Broke the
Jamaican National record in 220 yards and 440 yards as a High Schooler.

References

1947 births
Living people
Sportspeople from Kingston, Jamaica
Jamaican female sprinters
Olympic athletes of Jamaica
Athletes (track and field) at the 1964 Summer Olympics
Athletes (track and field) at the 1968 Summer Olympics
Athletes (track and field) at the 1972 Summer Olympics
Pan American Games bronze medalists for Jamaica
Pan American Games medalists in athletics (track and field)
Athletes (track and field) at the 1967 Pan American Games
Commonwealth Games bronze medallists for Jamaica
Commonwealth Games medallists in athletics
Athletes (track and field) at the 1966 British Empire and Commonwealth Games
Athletes (track and field) at the 1970 British Commonwealth Games
Medalists at the 1967 Pan American Games
Central American and Caribbean Games medalists in athletics
Olympic female sprinters
Medallists at the 1966 British Empire and Commonwealth Games